Huiva may stand for:

 Huiva (urban-type settlement), a town (urban-type settlement) in Zhytomyr Raion, Zhytomyr Oblast, Ukraine;
 Huiva (river), a river in Zhytomyr Oblast of Ukraine.